Dark Ages: Mage is a tabletop role-playing game supplement released by White Wolf Publishing in October 2002 for use with their game Dark Ages: Vampire, and is part of the World of Darkness series.

History
When White Wolf returned to historical settings in 2002, they relaunched Dark Ages: Vampire as a core rulebook. Supplements were added for other supernatural groups, each dependent upon Dark Ages: Vampire to play, including Dark Ages: Mage, which was released in October 2002 as a 240-page hardcover book, and later re-released as an e-book.

Description
This book acts as a precursor to Mage: The Ascension. It is a wildly different system from the modern counterpart, as Paradox has not quite taken hold. Because the consensus of reality is less powerful, magic itself is more bold. Rather than magic commonly being explained away by coincidence, it is often obviously the working of some powerful being.

References

Mage: The Ascension
Role-playing games introduced in 2002